The men's 100 metres T35 event at the 2020 Summer Paralympics in Tokyo, took place on 30 August 2021.

Records
Prior to the competition, the existing records were as follows:

Results
The final took place on 30 August 2021, at 19:04:

References

Men's 100 metres T35
2021 in men's athletics